Agnes Geziena Wolbert (born 20 August 1958) is a Dutch politician. As a member of the Labour Party (Partij van de Arbeid) she was an MP between 30 November 2006 and 23 March 2017. She focused on matters of senior citizen policy, normal and special health care, and home care.

References

External links 
  House of Representatives biography

1958 births
Living people
Labour Party (Netherlands) politicians
Members of the House of Representatives (Netherlands)
People from Oldenzaal
21st-century Dutch politicians
21st-century Dutch women politicians